Sherman "Bucky" Barton (February 2, 1875 - July 11, 1947) was an Outfielder in the Negro leagues.

Sherman's brother, Eugene Barton also played baseball, playing for the cross-town team Minneapolis Keystones while Sherman played for the St. Paul Colored Gophers, beginning in 1907.

Barton died at the age of 72 years in Chicago, Illinois.

References

External links

1875 births
1947 deaths
Page Fence Giants players
Algona Brownies players
Chicago Giants players
Columbia Giants players
Leland Giants players
St. Paul Colored Gophers players
People from Normal, Illinois
Baseball outfielders
20th-century African-American people